Thetford Academy is a coeducational independent school in Thetford, Vermont. Located at 304 Academy Road in Thetford Center, Vermont, it is the state's oldest secondary school. Thetford Academy celebrated its bicentennial year in 2018–2019.

An historic New England Town Academy (one of approximately 20 remaining in Vermont, New Hampshire, Maine, and Connecticut), Thetford Academy serves as the designated public school for the town of Thetford. The academy also has partnership agreements with the towns of Strafford, Vermont and Lyme, New Hampshire, and serves several towns that provide students a choice of high schools, or do not have a high school of their own. Thetford Academy also hosts a small contingent of international students from countries including China, South Korea, Greece, and Rwanda. In 2018–2019, Thetford Academy had 301 students enrolled in grades 7–12.

History

Thetford Academy opened in February 1819, in keeping with a provision of the Constitution of Vermont that required towns to provide free elementary schools and each county to provide a school for post-elementary studies. From its founding, Thetford Academy admitted both boys and girls, and the original academy building included separate entrances for each. The school was an almost immediate success, and annual growth in the student body led to the rapid construction of  new classrooms and dormitories.

The original 1818 academy building was lost in a fire in November 1942. High winds carried the fire to the rest of the campus, and the girls’ dormitory and library were also destroyed. Supporters moved quickly to rebuild the campus, an effort which began with the Colonial Revival schoolhouse now known as the White Building.

Campus

The school's campus spans 295 acres and includes several athletic fields, as well as a trail network that enables hiking, walking, running, mountain biking, and Nordic skiing. Thetford Academy is centered on a grassy quad, with its main buildings arrayed around it. These include the White Building and annex, Anderson Hall, the Vaughan Alumni Gymnasium, and the Arts and Sciences Building. The academy completed a campus development project in 2010, which included new science labs, physical education and athletics team facilities, a theater of performing arts, and a greenhouse.

Academics
Thetford Academy offers programs in Arts, Humanities, STEM, and Wellness. Its Unified Arts curriculum includes programs in visual arts, design technology, drama, Music, and culinary arts. Its Humanities program includes courses in English, social studies, and world languages. Thetford Academy's STEM curriculum focuses on science, technology, engineering, and science. The academy's Wellness program contains courses in physical education and health. Some programs are aimed at grades seven and eight, some at grades ten to twelve, some grades eleven and twelve, and some grades nine to twelve.

Student life
Thetford Academy encourages students to participate in extracurricular activities. A partial list of the school's clubs and organized activities include art, bass fishing, gaming, gender equity, robotics, and the student council.

The academy's advisory program includes faculty members providing advice and guidance to small groups of ten to twelve students. Advisors assist students in developing Personal Learning Plans (PLPs) and guide students to reflect on their academic growth and progress. Advisors also serve as liaisons between parents and guardians. Student groups bond by taking part in special projects and activities, as well as community service and initiatives.

Campus traditions at Thetford Academy include Founder's Day, which takes place in February of each year. Celebrations include a winter carnival, arts festival, games, and an all-school banquet. Additional activities include murals, costumes, snow sculptures, song, banners, centerpieces, and decorated sled parade floats.

In the 1970s, Thetford Academy began an annual "Mountain Day" tradition. Mountain Day encourages students to take part in outdoor activities. Events include students and faculty advisors taking part in hiking at nearby grade-specific mountains, so students who attend the academy from grades seven to twelve will have climbed all six mountains.

Athletics
Thetford Academy is a Division III school and competes in most sports in the Northern Vermont Athletic Conference as a member of the Capital League. The school's athletic teams stress its five principles of excellence, commitment, caring, cooperation, and respect for diversity, and have won several awards for good sportsmanship. Thetford Academy's participation in interscholastic sports are regulated by the Vermont Principals’ Association, and include baseball, basketball, soccer, softball, cross country running, track and field, and alpine skiing.

Admissions
Tuition at Thetford Academy for the 2020–2021 school year is $19,965. "Sending towns" in Vermont and New Hampshire are towns without their own public schools and they pay tuition for residents to attend schools in nearby towns. Thetford Academy's sending towns in Vermont include Corinth, Topsham, Strafford, Tunbridge, Chelsea, Sharon, Hartland, and Weathersfield. Thetford, Vermont and Lyme, New Hampshire also have sending agreements with Thetford Academy. The academy's tuition options also include private payment, scholarship programs, and financial aid programs.

Notable alumni 

 Thomas Angell, pastor, educator at Bates College
 E. Florence Barker, president of the Woman's Relief Corps
 Thomas W. Bicknell, historian, educator
 Sherburne Wesley Burnham, astronomer
 William E. Chandler, U.S. Senator, Secretary of Navy
 Thomas Morris Chester, African American journalist, lawyer, and Union Army soldier
 William Closson, artist
 Hannah Slade Currier, educator
 George N. Dale, Lieutenant governor of Vermont
 Ruth Dwyer, member of the Vermont House of Representatives and Republican nominee for governor in 1998 and 2000
 John Eaton, United States Commissioner of Education
 Ellen Frances Burpee Farr, painter
 Louise Woodworth Foss, elocutionist
 Charles Edward Hovey, Civil War general, first president of Illinois State University
 Mary Greenleaf Clement Leavitt, temperance movement missionary
 Anson S. Marshall, U.S. Attorney for New Hampshire
 Justin Smith Morrill, U.S. Senator
 George W. Morrison, U.S. Representative
 John B. Sanborn, lawyer, politician, Civil War general, and negotiator of treaties with Plains tribes

References

Sources
Mary B. Slade, Thetford Academy's First Century: 1819-1919. Capital City Press, Montpelier, VT, 1956.
Eaton, Gen. John. Thetford Academy, Thetford, Vermont: Seventy-Fifth Anniversary and Reunion, Thursday, June 28, 1894. Republican Press Association, Concord, NH, 1895.
Fifty for 250: An Anthology of Thetford's History: 1761-2011. Thetford Historical Society, Thetford, VT, 2011.

Educational institutions established in 1819
Private high schools in Vermont
Buildings and structures in Thetford, Vermont
Schools in Orange County, Vermont